Start the Fire may refer to:

 "Start the Fire" (Alcazar song), 2005
 "Start the Fire" (Tarkan song), 2006

See also 
 Firelighting, the process of artificially starting a fire
 Arson, crime of intentionally or maliciously igniting a fire
 Pyromania, disorder of pleasure to start fires
 "We Didn't Start the Fire", song by Billy Joel
 Firestarter (disambiguation)
 Start a Fire (disambiguation)